Peter Steiners Theaterstadl is a German television series.

See also
List of German television series

External links
 

1989 German television series debuts
2000 German television series endings
1990s German television series
German comedy television series
Television shows set in Bavaria
German-language television shows
Sat.1 original programming
RTL (German TV channel) original programming